The Black Butte Crater Lava Field, formerly known as Shoshone Lava Field is a lava plain in the U.S. state of Idaho, located  in Lincoln County north of the city of Shoshone.

It is the westernmost of the young lava fields occupying the Snake River Plain. The latest volcanic activity occurred during the Holocene period.

References

External links
 Black Butte Crater Lava Field. In: volcanoes.usgs.gov, United States Geological Survey

Volcanic fields of Idaho
Lava fields
Yellowstone hotspot
Landforms of Lincoln County, Idaho